Mongolia participated at the 2018 Asian Para Games which was held in Jakarta, Indonesia from 6 to 13 October 2018. The Mongolian delegation was composed of 40 athletes who participate in 9 sports.

Medalist

Medals by Sport

Medalist

See also
 Mongolia at the 2018 Asian Games

References

Nations at the 2018 Asian Para Games
2018 in Mongolian sport